Yesterday is an EP by English rock band the Beatles, released on 4 March 1966 by Parlophone in the UK. The Beatles' 11th EP, it was also released in Portugal, Spain and Brazil (with another cover photo). The EP was released in mono only, and the cover photograph was taken by Robert Whitaker.

Yesterday entered the UK EP chart on 12 March 1966, and from 26 March spent six weeks at number one. In all, it remained on the hit parade for 13 weeks.

Track listing
Side A
"Yesterday" (Lennon–McCartney) – 2:03
"Act Naturally" (Johnny Russell, Voni Morrison) – 2:33

Side B
"You Like Me Too Much" (Harrison) – 2:40
"It's Only Love" (Lennon–McCartney) – 1:53

Personnel
The Beatles
Paul McCartney – bass guitar (tracks 2–4), lead vocals (track 1), acoustic guitar (track 1), background vocals (tracks 2, 3), piano (track 3)
John Lennon – acoustic rhythm guitar (2–4), electric piano (track 3), tambourine (track 3), lead vocals (track 4), electric guitar (track 4)
George Harrison – lead guitar (tracks 2–4), lead vocals (track 3), electric guitar (track 3), acoustic guitar (track 3), 12-string acoustic guitar (track 4)
Ringo Starr – drums (tracks 2–4), lead vocals (track 2), sticks (track 2), tambourine (track 4)

Additional musicians 
George Martin – piano ("You Like Me Too Much")
Tony Gilbert – violin ("Yesterday")
Sidney Sax – violin ("Yesterday")
Kenneth Essex – viola ("Yesterday")
Francisco Gabarro – cello ("Yesterday")

References

The Beatles EPs
Albums produced by George Martin
Parlophone EPs
1966 EPs